Each "article" in this category is a collection of entries about several stamp issuers, presented in alphabetical order. The entries  are formulated on the micro model and so provide summary information about all known issuers.  

See the :Category:Compendium of postage stamp issuers page for details of the project.

Falkland Islands 

Dates 	1878 –
Capital 	Port Stanley
Currency 	(1878) 12 pence = 1 shilling, 20 shillings = 1 pound
		(1971) 100 pence = 1 pound

See also 	British Antarctic Territory;
		Falkland Islands Dependencies;
		South Georgia & South Sandwich Islands

Falkland Islands Dependencies 

Dates 	1946 –
Currency 	(1946) 12 pence = 1 shilling, 20 shillings = 1 pound
		(1971) 100 pence = 1 pound

Main Article  Postage stamps and postal history of the Falkland Islands Dependencies

Includes 	Graham Land (Falkland Island Dependencies);
		South Georgia (Falkland Islands Dependencies);
		South Orkneys (Falkland Islands Dependencies);
		South Shetlands (Falkland Islands Dependencies)

See also 	British Antarctic Territory;
		Falkland Islands;
		South Georgia & South Sandwich Islands

Far Eastern Republic 

Dates 	1920 – 1922
Capital 	Vladivostok
Currency 	100 kopecks = 1 Russian ruble

Refer 	Russian Civil War Issues

Faridkot 

Dates 	1879 – 1887
Currency 	(1879) 1 folus = 1 paisa = 1/4 anna
		(1886) 12 pies = 1 anna; 16 annas = 1 rupee

Refer 	Faridkot in Indian Convention states

Faroe Islands 

Dates 	1976 –
Capital 	Thorshavn
Currency 	100 ore = 1 krone
Main article  Postage stamps and postal history of the Faroe Islands

Farquhar 

Refer 	Zil Elwannyen Sesel

Federal People's Republic of Yugoslavia 

Refer 	Yugoslavia

Federated Malay States 

Dates 	1900 – 1935
Capital 	Kuala Lumpur
Currency 	100 cents = 1 dollar

Main Article  

See also 	Malaysia

Fernando Poo 

Now called Bioko (also spelled Bioco), Fernando Poo is an island off the west coast of Africa in the Gulf of Guinea.  Formerly part of Spanish Guinea, it is now part of Equatorial Guinea.

Dates 	1868 – 1968
Capital 	Santa Isabel
Currency 	100 centimos = 1 peseta

Refer 	Spanish Guinea

Fezzan 

Dates 	1943 – 1951
Capital 	Sabha
Currency 	French (100 centimes = 1 franc)

Main Article  

Includes 	Ghadames

See also 	Algeria;
		Cyrenaica;
		French Occupation Issues;
		Libya;
		Tripolitania

Fezzan (French Occupation) 

Refer 	Fezzan

Fiji 

Dates 	1870 –
Capital 	Suva
Currency 	(1870) 12 pence = 1 shilling, 20 shillings = 1 pound
		(1969) 100 cents = 1 dollar

Main Article  Postage stamps and postal history of Fiji

Finland 

Dates 	1856 –
Capital 	Helsinki
Currency 	(1856) 100 kopecks = 1 Russian ruble
		(1865) 100 penni = 1 markka
		(1963) 100 old marks = 1 new mark
		(2002) 100 cent = 1 euro

Main Article  Postage stamps and postal history of Finland

Finnish Occupation Issues 

Main Article  

Includes 	Aunus (Finnish Occupation);
		Eastern Karelia (Finnish Occupation)

Fiume 

Includes 	Arbe;
		Fiume (Free State);
		Fiume (Yugoslav Occupation);
		Veglia

Fiume (Free State) 

Dates 	1918 – 1924
Capital 	Fiume
Currency 	(1918) 100 Fillér = 1 krone
		(1919) 100 centesimi = 1 corona
		(1920) 100 centesimi = 1 lira

Refer 	Fiume

Fiume (Yugoslav Occupation) 

Dates 	1945 – 1947
Currency 	100 centesimi = 1 lira

Refer 	Fiume

Fiume & Kupa Zone (Italian Occupation) 

Dates 	1941 – 1942
Currency 	100 paras = 1 dinar

Refer 	Italian Occupation Issues

Formosa 

Refer 	Chinese Nationalist Republic (Taiwan);
		Taiwan

France 

Dates 	1849 –
Capital 	Paris
Currency 	(1849) 100 centimes = 1 franc
		(2002) 100 cent = 1 euro

Main Article  Postage stamps and postal history of France

Free French Forces in the Levant 

Dates 	1942 – 1946
Currency 	100 centimes = 1 franc

Refer 	French Occupation Issues

French Colonies 

Dates 	1859 – 1886
Currency 	100 centimes = 1 franc

Includes 	French Committee of National Liberation

French Committee of National Liberation 

Dates 	1943 – 1945
Currency 	100 centimes = 1 franc

Refer 	French Colonies

French Community 

Refer 	French Colonies

French Congo 

Dates 	1891 – 1906
Capital 	Brazzaville
Currency 	100 centimes = 1 franc

Main Article  

See also 	Congo Republic;
		French Equatorial Africa;
		Middle Congo

French Equatorial Africa (AEF) 

Dates 	1936 – 1958
Capital 	Brazzaville
Currency 	100 centimes = 1 franc

Main Article  

See also 	Central African Republic;
		Chad;
		Congo Republic;
		French Congo;
		Gabon;
		Middle Congo;
		Oubangui–Chari

French Guiana 

Dates 	1886 – 1947
Capital 	Cayenne
Currency 	100 centimes = 1 franc

Main Article  

Includes 	Inini

French Guinea 

Dates 	1892 – 1944
Capital 	Conakry
Currency 	100 centimes = 1 franc

Main Article  

See also 	French West Africa;
		Guinea

French Indian Settlements 

Dates 	1892 – 1954
Currency 	(1892) 100 centimes = 1 franc
		(1923) 24 caches = 1 fanon; 8 fanons = 1 rupee

Main Article

French Levant 

Refer 	French Post Offices in the Turkish Empire

French Morocco 

Dates 	1914 – 1956
Capital 	Rabat
Currency 	100 centimes = 1 franc

Includes 	French Protectorate, Morocco

See also 	Morocco (French Post Offices)

French Occupation Issues 

Main Article  

Includes 	Arad (French Occupation);
		Castelrosso (French Occupation);
		Cilicia (French Occupation);
		Free French Forces in the Levant;
		Korce (Koritza);
		Memel (French Administration);
		Syria (French Occupation)

See also 	Fezzan

French Oceanic Settlements 

Dates 	1892 – 1956
Capital 	Papeete (Tahiti)
Currency 	100 centimes = 1 franc

Main Article  

Includes 	Tahiti

See also 	French Polynesia

French Polynesia 

Dates 	1958 –
Capital 	Papeete (Tahiti)
Currency 	100 centimes = 1 franc

See also 	French Oceanic Settlements;
		Tahiti

French Post Offices Abroad 

Main Article  

Includes 	China (French Post Offices);
		Ethiopia (French Post Offices);
		Japan (French Post Offices);
		Madagascar (French Post Offices);
		Majunga (French Post Office);
		Morocco (French Post Offices);
		Tangier (French Post Office);
		Tientsin (French Post Office);
		Zanzibar (French Post Office)

See also 	Crete (French Post Offices);
		Egypt (French Post Offices);
		French Post Offices in the Turkish Empire

French Post Offices in the Turkish Empire 

Dates 	1885 – 1923
Currency 	French and Turkish both used

Main Article  

Includes 	Beirut (French Post Office);
		Dedêagatz (French Post Office);
		Kavalla (French Post Office);
		Port Lagos (French Post Office);
		Vathy (French Post Office)

See also 	French Post Offices Abroad;
		Crete (French Post Offices);
		Egypt (French Post Offices)

French Protectorate, Morocco 

Dates 	1914 – 1915
Capital 	Rabat
Currency 	100 centimes = 1 franc

Refer 	French Morocco

French Somali Coast 

Dates 	1902 – 1967
Capital 	Djibouti
Currency 	100 centimes = 1 franc

Main Article  

See also 	Djibouti;
		French Territory of Afars & Issas

French Soudan 

Dates 	1894 – 1944
Capital 	Bamako
Currency 	100 centimes = 1 franc

Main Article  

Includes 	Senegambia & Niger;
		Upper Senegal & Niger

See also 	French West Africa;
		Mali Federation;
		Mali Republic

French Southern and Antarctic Territories
Dates
1955 –
Capital
Port-aux-Francais
Currency
100 centimes = 1 franc
Main Article
Postage stamps and postal history of the French Southern and Antarctic Territories

French Territory of Afars & Issas 

Dates 	1967 – 1977
Capital 	Djibouti
Currency 	100 centimes = 1 franc

Main Article  

See also 	Djibouti;
		French Somali Coast

French West Africa 

Dates 	1944 – 1959
Capital 	Dakar
Currency 	100 centimes = 1 franc

Main Article  

Includes 	Dakar–Abidjan

See also 	Dahomey;
		French Guinea;
		French Soudan;
		Ivory Coast;
		Mauritania;
		Niger;
		Senegal;
		Upper Volta

French Zone (General Issues) 

Dates 	1945 – 1946
Currency 	100 pfennige = 1 mark

Refer 	Germany (Allied Occupation)

Friendly Islands 

Refer 	Tonga

Fujeira 

Dates 	1964 – 1972
Currency 	(1964) 100 naye paise = 1 rupee
		(1967) 100 dirhams = 1 riyal

Refer 	Trucial States

Funafuti 

Refer 	Tuvalu

Funchal 

Dates 	1892 – 1905
Capital 	Funchal
Currency 	1000 reis = 1 milreis

Main Article  

See also 	Madeira

References

Bibliography
 Stanley Gibbons Ltd, Europe and Colonies 1970, Stanley Gibbons Ltd, 1969
 Stanley Gibbons Ltd, various catalogues
 Stuart Rossiter & John Flower, The Stamp Atlas, W H Smith, 1989
 XLCR Stamp Finder and Collector's Dictionary, Thomas Cliffe Ltd, c.1960

External links
 AskPhil – Glossary of Stamp Collecting Terms
 Encyclopaedia of Postal History

Fa